Shibamoto (written: 芝本 or 柴本) is a Japanese surname. Notable people with the surname include:

, Japanese footballer
, Japanese actress

Japanese-language surnames